Janet Mikhail (born  1945) or Janet Michael, sometimes known as Janet Khouri (جانيت خوري) is the former mayor of Ramallah in the West Bank.

She is the first woman to hold this post.  She was head teacher of the girls' school in Ramallah for 20 years, now retired.  She is a Palestinian Christian (Roman Catholic).

She was chosen as mayor on 29 December 2005 by the newly elected 15-member city council.  She ran as a political independent (although some sources have associated her with the Popular Front for the Liberation of Palestine movement), and was the head of the "Ramallah for All" independent list, which won six seats in local elections held earlier in December. The Fatah-associated "Homeland (Watan)" faction, headed by Palestinian Legislative Council member Ghazi Hanania, also won six seats, while the Hamas-affiliated faction of "Change and Reform" headed by Khaldoun Khader won three seats.  The new council voted 9-6 to elect Mikhail as mayor, after the three "Change and Reform" council members allied themselves with her "Ramallah for All" faction.

See also
Palestinian Christians

External links
Interview with her
Khaleej Times report
 Report in French

1945 births
Living people
Mayors of Ramallah
Palestinian schoolteachers
Palestinian Roman Catholics
Women mayors of places in Palestina
Palestinian women in politics